RS Puppis (or RS Pup) is a Cepheid variable star around  away in the constellation of Puppis.  It is one of the biggest and brightest known Cepheids in the Milky Way galaxy and has one of the longest periods for this class of star at 41.5 days.

Distance
The distance to RS Puppis is important because Cepheids serve as a marker for distances within the Milky Way galaxy and for nearby galaxies.

Because it is located in a large nebula, astronomers using the ESO's New Technology Telescope at La Silla Observatory, Chile have been able to measure its distance in 2008 by strictly geometric analysis of light echoes from particles in the nebula, determining it to be  from Earth, the most accurate measurement achieved for any Cepheid as of early 2008.

The light echo technique was used again in 2014, this time with Hubble Space Telescope Advanced Camera for Surveys polarimetric images.

Variability

RS Puppis is a classical Cepheid variable and its brightness changes regularly due to pulsations during which its size and temperature both vary.  Its visual magnitude changes from 6.52 at maximum to 7.67 at minimum.  The light curve shows a rapid rise in brightness with the slower drop in brightness taking about three times as long.  It has a regular period of 41.5 days but it changes very slowly and erratically.  For example, the period has changed on average by about 144.7 s per year, but has sometimes remained constant for several years.

RS Puppis is considered to be a long-period Cepheid because it has a period longer than 10 days.  The only nearer long-period Cepheid is l Carinae.  Cepheids closely follow a period-luminosity relationship, with more luminous stars having longer periods.  RS Puppis has one of the longest periods of Cepheids in the Milky Way and therefore is also one of the most luminous.

Properties

RS Puppis is a supergiant with a spectral classification of G2Ib, although its spectral type varies between F9 and G7 as its temperature changes.  It lies on the instability strip and based on the rate of change of its period is thought to be crossing it for the third time.  The third crossing occurs as a star is evolving towards cooler temperatures for the second time after performing a blue loop.  The third crossing of the instability strip occurs much more slowly than the first crossing just after a star leaves the main sequence.

RS Puppis pulsates every 41.5 days, during which time its radius, temperature, and luminosity change. Typically for long-period Cepheids, it pulsates in the fundamental mode.

References

External links
Universe Today - RS Puppis Light Echoes
NASA - RS Puppis

Classical Cepheid variables
Puppis
Puppis, RS
F-type supergiants
068860
Articles containing video clips
040233
G-type supergiants
Durchmusterung objects